The Nokia N75 is a smartphone by Nokia. It uses Series 60 3rd Edition of Symbian OS. AT&T Mobility is a carrier of the N75 in the United States. It has been made specifically for the North American 3G market, supporting WCDMA 850/1900 frequencies; however, it was also available in other countries such as the UK.

Specifications

Reaction
CNet gave it 3/5, liking the call quality and display but disliking the battery life and camera. Mobile Tech Review gave it 4/5.  PCMag gave it 2.5/5 with similar praise and criticism.

References

External links 
 Official Nokia N75 Product Page
 Nokia technical specs
 N75 Review

Universal Plug and Play devices
Nokia Nseries
Mobile phones introduced in 2007
Mobile phones with infrared transmitter